Oleiagrimonas  is a genus of bacteria.

References

Further reading 
 
 

Xanthomonadales
Bacteria genera